In the geometry of hyperbolic 3-space, the hexagonal tiling-triangular tiling honeycomb is a paracompact uniform honeycomb, constructed from triangular tiling, hexagonal tiling, and trihexagonal tiling cells, in a rhombitrihexagonal tiling vertex figure. It has a single-ring Coxeter diagram, and is named by its two regular cells.

Symmetry
A lower symmetry form, index 6, of this honeycomb can be constructed with [(6,3,6,3*)] symmetry, represented by a cube fundamental domain, and an octahedral Coxeter diagram .

Related honeycombs

The cyclotruncated octahedral-hexagonal tiling honeycomb,  has a higher symmetry construction as the order-4 hexagonal tiling.

See also 
 Uniform honeycombs in hyperbolic space
 List of regular polytopes

References 
Coxeter, Regular Polytopes, 3rd. ed., Dover Publications, 1973. . (Tables I and II: Regular polytopes and honeycombs, pp. 294–296)
Coxeter, The Beauty of Geometry: Twelve Essays, Dover Publications, 1999  (Chapter 10: Regular honeycombs in hyperbolic space, Summary tables II,III,IV,V, p212-213)
 Jeffrey R. Weeks The Shape of Space, 2nd edition  (Chapter 16-17: Geometries on Three-manifolds I,II)
 Norman Johnson Uniform Polytopes, Manuscript
 N.W. Johnson: The Theory of Uniform Polytopes and Honeycombs, Ph.D. Dissertation, University of Toronto, 1966 
 N.W. Johnson: Geometries and Transformations, (2018) Chapter 13: Hyperbolic Coxeter groups

Hexagonal tilings
Honeycombs (geometry)